Donna Victoria Kellogg,  (born 20 January 1978) is an English former badminton player. She is the European Champion, winning the women's doubles titles in 2000, 2006 and the mixed doubles title in 2008. She won the silver medal at the 2006 World Championships. Kellogg also won the women's doubles title at the 1998 Commonwealth Games, and was part of the England winning team at the 1998 and 2002 Commonwealth Games.

Career 
Kellogg first played badminton at the age of 10. Her first representative match for England was against China at the 1997 World Championships in Scotland. The best performances of her career are winning the European women's doubles gold medal in 2000 with Joanne Goode and in 2006 with Gail Emms.

Kellogg's highest world ranking is fourth in women's doubles with a national ranking of first in the same event.

1998 Commonwealth Games 
She represented England and won two gold medals (women's doubles and team) and a bronze medal (mixed doubles), at the 1998 Commonwealth Games in Kuala Lumpur, Malaysia.

2004 Summer Olympics 
Kellogg competed with Gail Emms in women's doubles at the 2004 Summer Olympics. They defeated Koon Wai Chee and Li Wing Mui of Hong Kong in the first round, but were defeated by Wei Yili and Zhao Tingting of China in the round of 16.

2006 World Championships and Commonwealth Games 
Kellogg reached the mixed doubles final at the 2006 World Championships with Anthony Clark, losing in the final against Nathan Robertson and Gail Emms. She also won a silver medal (team) and bronze medal (doubles) at the 2006 Commonwealth Games.

2008 Summer Olympics 
She and partner Gail Emms faced China in doubles at the 2008 Olympics in the round of 16. They lost the first match.

Personal life 
In 1999 she graduated from Loughborough University with a degree in Sports Science. Her occupation/professional qualification is BSC Physical Education, Sport Science and Recreational Management.

Kellogg was appointed Member of the Order of the British Empire (MBE) in the 2010 Birthday Honours.

Achievements

World Championships 
Mixed doubles

Commonwealth Games 
Women's doubles

Mixed doubles

European Championships 
Women's doubles

Mixed doubles

European Junior Championships 
Girls' singles

Girls' doubles

Mixed doubles

BWF Superseries 
The BWF Superseries, which was launched on 14 December 2006 and implemented in 2007, is a series of elite badminton tournaments, sanctioned by the Badminton World Federation (BWF). Successful players are invited to the Superseries Finals, which are held at the end of each year.

Mixed doubles

  BWF Superseries Finals tournament
  BWF Superseries tournament

IBF World Grand Prix 
The World Badminton Grand Prix has been sanctioned by the International Badminton Federation from 1983 to 2006.

Women's doubles

Mixed doubles

IBF International 
Mixed doubles

Record against selected opponents 
Mixed doubles results with Anthony Clark against Superseries finalists, World Championships semifinalists, and Olympic quarterfinalists.

  Zhang Jun & Gao Ling 2–2
  Zheng Bo & Gao Ling 1–4
  He Hanbin & Yu Yang 1–5
  Xie Zhongbo & Zhang Yawen 3–3
  Jens Eriksen & Mette Schjoldager 0–2
  Joachim Fischer Nielsen & Christinna Pedersen 2–2
  Thomas Laybourn & Kamilla Rytter Juhl 1–1
  Nathan Robertson & Gail Emms 1–3
  Flandy Limpele & Vita Marissa 1–0
  Nova Widianto & Liliyana Natsir 3–7
  Ko Sung-hyun & Ha Jung-eun 0–1
  Koo Kien Keat & Wong Pei Tty 5–2
  Robert Mateusiak & Nadieżda Zięba 3–1
  Songphon Anugritayawon & Kunchala Voravichitchaikul 2–1
  Sudket Prapakamol & Saralee Thungthongkam 1–2

References

External links 
 
 
 
 
 

1978 births
Living people
People from Spondon
Sportspeople from Derby
English female badminton players
Badminton players at the 2000 Summer Olympics
Badminton players at the 2004 Summer Olympics
Badminton players at the 2008 Summer Olympics
Olympic badminton players of Great Britain
Badminton players at the 1998 Commonwealth Games
Badminton players at the 2002 Commonwealth Games
Badminton players at the 2006 Commonwealth Games
Commonwealth Games gold medallists for England
Commonwealth Games silver medallists for England
Commonwealth Games bronze medallists for England
Commonwealth Games medallists in badminton
Members of the Order of the British Empire
Alumni of Loughborough University
Medallists at the 1998 Commonwealth Games
Medallists at the 2002 Commonwealth Games
Medallists at the 2006 Commonwealth Games